A zuria is a dress worn by the Tigrinya women in Eritrea and Ethiopia. Traditional zurias go to the ankles, sometimes with a gauze hood around the head and shoulders. Zurias come in different forms and designs with an extra sheen due to the demands of fashion. Zurias are worn during holidays, weddings, or parties.

References

Eritrean clothing
Ethiopian clothing
Women in Eritrea
Women in Ethiopia
Amharic language
Ethiopian fashion
Eritrean fashion